Sean Hillier (born 19 April 1986) is an English semi-professional footballer who plays as a defender. Hillier began his career at Brentford and made one professional appearance before dropping into non-League football upon his release in 2005. He played the majority of his career for North Greenford United and made over 250 appearances across five spells with the club. He is currently assistant coach of Brentford Women.

Playing career

Brentford 
Hillier began his career as a youth at Brentford and embarked on a scholarship at the beginning 2002–03 season. He played in the 2–0 2004 Supporters Direct Cup win over AFC Wimbledon on 20 July 2004 and replaced Chris Hargreaves after 87 minutes. Hillier received his first call into the first team squad for a Football League Trophy first round match against Milton Keynes Dons on 28 September 2004. Hillier made his professional debut when he started the match at right back and played the full 90 minutes of the 3–0 defeat. Hillier was an unused substitute during two further matches and was released at the end of the 2004–05 season.

Welling United (loan) 
Hillier signed on loan for Conference South club Welling United on 3 September 2004, as cover at right back for Tony Browne. He made one appearance and returned to Brentford on 27 September.

Hendon (loan) 
Hillier and Brentford youth colleague James Morrison joined Isthmian League Premier Division club Hendon on loan in January 2005. He made two appearances for the club and returned to Griffin Park in mid February.

North Greenford United (loan) 
Hillier joined Combined Counties League Premier Division club North Greenford United on loan in February 2005, until the end of the 2004–05 season. He made 11 appearances and scored two goals during his spell.

AFC Wimbledon 
Hillier signed for Isthmian League Premier Division club AFC Wimbledon on 30 July 2005. He made his only first team appearance for the club as a 51st-minute substitute for Michael Woolner in a 2–0 defeat to Bromley on 25 October 2005 and departed at the end of the 2005–06 season.

Return to North Greenford United (loan) 
Hillier rejoined Combined Counties League Premier Division club North Greenford United on loan in November 2005, until the end of the 2005–06 season. He made 28 appearances during his spell and scored a seasonal-best five goals.

Hanwell Town 
Hillier signed for Southern League First Division South & West club Hanwell Town during the 2006 off-season. He left the club in early 2007.

Third spell with North Greenford United 
Hillier rejoined North Greenford United for the third time in early 2007 and made his first appearance in a 3–0 win over Raynes Park Vale on 3 February. He helped the Blues to the 2007 Premier Challenge Cup Final versus Merstham, but suffered a 4–1 defeat. He made 21 appearances and scored one goal during the 2006–07 season. He departed the Blues in February 2008, having made 46 appearances and scored three goals during his year with the club.

Chertsey Town 
Hillier signed for Combined Counties League Premier Division club Chertsey Town on 27 February 2008 and made eight appearances during the remainder of the 2007–08 season, before departing the club.

Fourth and fifth spells with North Greenford United 
Hillier signed for North Greenford United for the fourth time during the 2008 off-season and was a virtual ever-present during the 2008–09 season, making 42 appearances and helping the Blues to a second-place finish in the Combined Counties League Premier Division. Hillier won the first competitive silverware of his career during the 2009–10 season, with the Combined Counties League Premier Division title (which brought promotion to the Southern League First Division Central) and the Middlesex Senior Charity Cup. The cup win set up a match versus Middlesex Senior Cup winners Staines Town for the George Ruffell Memorial Shield in August 2010, but though Hillier got on the scoresheet, the Blues were denied more silverware after suffering a shootout defeat.

Playing Southern League First Division Central football for the 2010–11 season, Hillier made 52 appearances and scored one goal in a season of consolidation. Hillier played through until the end of the 2012–13 season, which was his last with the club until his return in 2017. In the interim, he played for Middlesex County League Premier Division club New Hanford and spent time recovering from a tendon injury.

Coaching career 
In June 2019, Hillier was announced as assistant to Brentford Women head coach Karleigh Osborne. He is also a coach alongside Osborne at 24 Football Academy in Northolt.

Honours 
Brentford
 Supporters Direct Cup: 2004
North Greenford United
Combined Counties League Premier Division: 2009–10
 Middlesex Senior Charity Cup: 2009–10

Individual

 North Greenford United Player of the Year: 2010–11

Career statistics

References

External links

Sean Hillier at brentfordfc.com

1986 births
Living people
English footballers
Association football defenders
Brentford F.C. players
Hendon F.C. players
AFC Wimbledon players
North Greenford United F.C. players
Hanwell Town F.C. players
Chertsey Town F.C. players
Welling United F.C. players
National League (English football) players
Isthmian League players
Southern Football League players
Association football coaches